The 12th Boat Race took place on the River Thames on 8 April 1854.  Typically held annually, the event is a side-by-side rowing race between crews from the Universities of Oxford and Cambridge. The race was won by Oxford who triumphed over Cambridge by seven lengths.

Background

The Boat Race is a side-by-side rowing competition between the University of Oxford (sometimes referred to as the "Dark Blues") and the University of Cambridge (sometimes referred to as the "Light Blues").  The race was first held in 1829, and since 1845 has taken place on the  Championship Course on the River Thames in southwest London.  Oxford went into the race as reigning champions, having defeated Cambridge by nine lengths in the previous race.  Cambridge led overall with seven wins to Oxford's four.

There was no Boat Race in 1853 as the Henley Royal Regatta was scheduled for the same time as that proposed by Cambridge in their challenge to Oxford.  The universities did however race each other that year, in the Grand Challenge Cup, which was won by Oxford.  On 11 February 1854, a challenge was sent to Oxford by the former Light Blue cox Thomas Selby Egan, who had assumed temporary captaincy of Cambridge University Boat Club, despite having coached the Dark Blues to victory in the 1852 race.

Although Oxford arrived at Putney as favourites to win the race, Cambridge's style was enough to force the odds to evens. However, in a practice race, the Dark Blues defeated a watermen scratch crew easily and restored their position as pre-race favourites. The umpire for the race was Charles Jasper Selwyn and the starter was Edward Searle.

Crews
Cambridge saw one rower return from the 1852 race in F. Johnson, while Oxford's crew contained two former Blues in Nind and the Oxford University Boat Club president Olliver Meade King.

Race

Oxford were pre-race favourites.  They won the toss and elected to start from the Middlesex station, handing Cambridge the Surrey side of the river.  The race commenced at 10.40 a.m., with Oxford pulling away from the start.  The Dark Blues were clear of Cambridge by the time the crews reached the Crab Tree.  By Hammersmith Bridge both coxes were forced to take evasive action as a result of a barge blocking their route.  With a lead of two lengths after the bridge, Oxford continued to increase their lead, eventually passing the flag-boat with a seven-length advantage in a time of 25 minutes 29 seconds.  It was their third consecutive victory and took the overall record to 7–5 in Cambridge's favour.

In a speech in the evening's celebrations, Charles Selwyn, who had umpired this and the previous four Boat Races, declared that he was "no longer young and active enough" to continue to act in the capacity of umpire; he would be replaced in 1856 by W. G. Rich, the former Cambridge University Boat Club president who had rowed in both the March and December races of 1849.

References
Notes

Bibliography

External links
 Official website

1854 in sports
The Boat Race
April 1854 sports events